Malik Sajad is a graphic novelist based in Srinagar, Jammu and Kashmir.

His debut graphic novel, Munnu - A Boy from Kashmir was released with critical acclaim and won the Verve Story Teller of The Year award. The debut novel was made a part of the permanent collection (Artists' Books) at the Brooklyn Museum in New York and his sketches have been compared to the work of Art Spiegelman such as Maus and work of Marjane Satrapi such as Persepolis.

Sajad's debut novel was released in 2015 in Britain, but it took another six months for it to come out in India. The publisher, Fourth Estate, told him that the authorities were slow to provide the ISBN number that all published books must have.

Recognitions 

Malik is an Inlaks Scholar (2011) and OMI Francis Greenburger (2013) fellow.

As a cartoonist

Sajad was 14 when he started working as a cartoonist, for a regional newspaper, Greater Kashmir. It was a lead story in 2005-06 by journalist, Arif Shafi Wani about endangered Kashmiri deers in Kashmiri forests, from where he drew inspiration, for his debut novel, by comparing Kashmiris with Hanguls as humanoids.

Influences

Graphic novels such as  Relatively Indolent But Relentless by Matt Freedman, Fun Home by Alison Bechdel.   Among others, Sajad also likes works of Käthe Kollwitz, Lynd Ward, Keith Haring, and work of Betye Saar.

Positions on Kashmir conflict

Sajad believes that the conflict in Kashmir has 'shaken people like an earthquake'. He says, "everyone witnessed and felt the devastating tremor; some houses fell and the families were buried, some houses developed cracks and some stayed unharmed. This changed the face, structure and traditional landscape of Kashmir forever."

References 

Indian cartoonists
1987 births
Kashmiri people
Living people
Journalists from Jammu and Kashmir
People from Srinagar
Indian graphic novelists
21st-century Indian journalists
21st-century Indian artists
21st-century Indian novelists